Marisa Christiane Wilhelmina Olislagers (born 9 September 2000) is a Dutch professional footballer who plays as a left-back or midfielder for Eredivisie club Twente and the Netherlands national team.

Club career
Olislagers started her career with her hometown club BVC Bloemendaal at the age of eight. She then played for RKVV DSS, Telstar and CTO Amsterdam in her youth career.

In April 2018, Olislagers joined Eredivisie club ADO Den Haag. She made her debut on 7 September 2018 in a 2–0 league defeat against Excelsior. On 13 June 2019, she extended her contract with the club for one more season.

In April 2020, Olislagers moved to Twente.

International career
Olislagers has represented Netherlands at various youth levels. In November 2021, she received her first call-up to the senior team. She made her debut on 29 November in a goalless friendly draw against Japan.

Career statistics

International

Honours
Twente
 Eredivisie: 2020–21, 2021–22
 Eredivisie Cup: 2021–22
 Dutch Women's Super Cup: 2022

References

External links
 
Senior national team profile at Onsoranje.nl (in Dutch)
Under-23 national team profile at Onsoranje.nl (in Dutch)
Under-19 national team profile at Onsoranje.nl (in Dutch)
Under-17 national team profile at Onsoranje.nl (in Dutch)
Under-16 national team profile at Onsoranje.nl (in Dutch)
Under-15 national team profile at Onsoranje.nl (in Dutch)

2000 births
Living people
Women's association football defenders
Women's association football midfielders
Dutch women's footballers
Netherlands women's international footballers
Eredivisie (women) players
ADO Den Haag (women) players
FC Twente (women) players
UEFA Women's Euro 2022 players
People from Velsen
Footballers from North Holland